CX 22 Radio Universal is a Uruguayan Spanish-language AM radio station that broadcasts from Montevideo.

Selected programs
 Fútbol Universal (football with Alberto Kesman)
 Fuentes confiables (talk show with Aldo Silva)
 La oreja (interviews with Omar Gutiérrez)
 La oral deportiva (sports with Enrique Yannuzzi and Alberto Kesman)

References

External links
 
 970 AM

Spanish-language radio stations
Radio in Uruguay
Mass media in Montevideo